Fanni Fábián (born 30 October 2002) is a Hungarian swimmer. She competed in the women's 200 metre freestyle event at the 2020 European Aquatics Championships, in Budapest, Hungary.

References

2002 births
Living people
Hungarian female freestyle swimmers
Place of birth missing (living people)
European Aquatics Championships medalists in swimming
21st-century Hungarian women